Frederick Jacob Gaiser (August 31, 1885 – October 9, 1918) was a pitcher in Major League Baseball. He played for the St. Louis Cardinals in 1908.

References

External links

1885 births
1918 deaths
Deaths from Spanish flu
Major League Baseball pitchers
Major League Baseball players from Germany
St. Louis Cardinals players
Holyoke Papermakers players
Sportspeople from Stuttgart